The 2013 Council of the Isles of Scilly election took place on 2 May 2013 as part of the 2013 local elections in the United Kingdom The council is a sui generis unitary authority within the ceremonial county of Cornwall.

The whole council of 21 members was up for election, with thirteen members elected in the St Mary's electoral division and another eight from the 'Off Islands': being two each from Bryher, St Martin's, St Agnes and Tresco. Since only one candidate stood for each of six 'Off Island' seats they were elected unopposed. The Green Party of England and Wales put up candidates - the first time any party had done so, but both were unsuccessful.

As with other unitary and county elections in England, these local elections in the Isles of Scilly took place for the first time since 1993 without a European or Westminster election on the same day.

Results

|}

By ward

|}

|}

|}

|}

|}

References

External links

Election results for St Mary's, 2013 at Isles of Scilly Council web site
Election results for St Martin's, 2013 at Isles of Scilly Council web site

2013
2013 English local elections
2010s in Cornwall